Hmiel is a surname. Notable people with the surname include:

Shane Hmiel (born 1980), American racing driver
Steve Hmiel (born  1938), Canadian football player